The Hospital of San Paolo (originally Ospedale di San Paolo dei Convalescenti), later known as the Spedale of the Leopoldine, is a former hospital from the 13th century, now museum of modern works, located on Piazza Santa Maria Novella number 10, in Florence, region of Tuscany, Italy.

Past History
The hospital is thought by some to date to 1211-1222, when St Francis visited the city. At this time, the hospital was called Ospedale di San Francesco and it was run by lay-members of Franciscan order, called pinzocheri. The hospital had an abundance of patronage, and commissioned in 1403 a design (circa 1459) by Michelozzo. In 1504, the hospital of Santi Jacopo e Filippo, known as del Porcellana was merged with the San Paolo. In 1780, by order of the Grand Duke Peter Leopold II, this functions of this hospital were moved to the hospital of Santa Maria Nuova; the building was converted to a school for girls (Scuola Leopoldina).

Of the original structures, the long dormitory hall, the Corsia is accessed by Via Palazzuolo. The Loggia (1489-1496) on the piazza is supported by Corinthian columns, and was influenced by Brunelleschi's Loggia for the Foundling Hospital at Piazza Santissima Annunziata. In the spandrels are medallions of Franciscan saints by Andrea della Robbia. In the center is a bust of Ferdinando I de'Medici (circa 1594) by Pietro Francavilla. The portal to the church has a Della Robbia terracotta lunnete of the Encounter of St Francis and Dominic

In 1789, Giuseppe Salvetti replaced the dilapidated columns of the portico with new ones.

Museo Nazionale Alinari della Fotografia (MNAF)
See entry at Museo Nazionale Alinari della Fotografia

From November 2006 houses the structure accessed at Piazza Santa Maria Novella number 14 has been occupied by the Alinari National Museum of Photography. The restructuring of the space, owned by the city, was completed by the Ente Cassa di Risparmio di Firenze. The nucleus of the collection is property of Fratelli Alinari. 

The museum has temporary exhibits, a permanent exhibit about the art and science of photography, including interactive exhibits for school-age children. It also has exhibits for the visually handicapped.

Museo Novecento
As of 2014, this city museum can be accessed from Piazza Santa Maria Novella number 10. This museum is dedicated to the Italian art of the 20th century. It contains exhibit halls, study rooms, and a room for conferences and cinema.

References

Hospital buildings completed in the 15th century
Renaissance architecture in Florence
Hospitals in Florence
San Paolo
1780 disestablishments in Italy
Art museums and galleries in Florence